Vicki Heather Wickham  (born 1939) is an English talent manager, entertainment producer, and songwriter.

Career
Wickham was an assistant producer of the 1960s British television show Ready Steady Go!, and was fashion consultant for the short-lived The Mod's Monthly magazine, first issued in March 1964 by Albert Hand Publications, and edited by Mark Burns. However she is probably best known as the manager of well-known pop/soul acts Dusty Springfield and Labelle.

Wickham co-wrote (with Simon Napier-Bell) the English lyrics to Springfield's only British No. 1 hit, "You Don't Have to Say You Love Me", adapted from the Italian song "Io che non vivo senza te". With Penny Valentine, she co-wrote Dancing with Demons: The Authorised Biography of Dusty Springfield.

Wickham is gay, but has said that her sexuality was never a problem, stating that she "wasn't out in the 60s. I didn't know what I was, really. Everyone knew I was gay, but we were so unpolitically conscious". In 2012 she told BBC radio listeners: "I found somebody in 1970 and have been with her ever since. I wouldn't swap it for the world."

Her long-term partner is the musician Nona Hendryx.

Awards
Wickham was given a Music Industry "Woman of the Year Lifetime Achievement Award" in 1999, and was appointed an Officer of the Order of the British Empire (OBE) in the 2013 Queen's Birthday Honours List, for services to music.

References

Bibliography
Valentine, Penny; Wickham, Vicki (April 2000). Dancing with Demons: The Authorised Biography of Dusty Springfield. London: Hodder & Stoughton Ltd. p. 320.

External links

Discography at Discogs
Interview, "Ready, Vicki, Go", The Guardian,  30 November 1999

1939 births
Living people
English songwriters
Officers of the Order of the British Empire
Place of birth missing (living people)
English LGBT people